The 2010 Men's Indoor Pan American Cup was the 5th edition of the Indoor Pan American Cup, an indoor hockey competition. The tournament was held in Barquisimeto, Venezuela, from 9–15 August.

Canada won the tournament for the third time, defeating the United States 6–3 in the final. Argentina won the bronze medal after defeating Trinidad and Tobago 4–2.

Teams
The following nine teams competed for the title:

Results
All times are local (UTC−04:00).

Preliminary round

Pool A

Pool B

Classification round

Fifth to ninth place classification

Crossover

Seventh and eighth place

Fifth and sixth place

First to fourth place classification

Semi-finals

Third and fourth place

Final

Awards

Statistics

Final standings

References

Indoor Pan American Cup
2010
Pan American Cup